Renée Slotopolsky de Epelbaum (June 15, 1920 – February 7, 1998), also known as Yoyi Epelbaum, was an Argentine human rights activist. She is known for being one of the founders of the Mothers of the Plaza de Mayo, an association of mothers of those disappeared during the military dictatorship known as National Reorganization Process that ruled Argentina between 1976 and 1983. She was also an early member of the Movimiento Judío por los Derechos Humanos.

Disappearance of her children 
One of her sons, Luis Marcelo (25), a medical student, was kidnapped on August 10, 1976 in Buenos Aires as he left the university. Claudio (23), a law student and Lila (20), a dancer, were sent on holiday to the city of Punta del Este in Uruguay, where they thought they would be safe. However, Argentine squads in cooperation with the Uruguayan regime followed them, and they were kidnapped on November 4, 1976.

References 

1920 births
1998 deaths
Argentine Jews
Jewish human rights activists
Mothers of the Plaza de Mayo
People from Entre Ríos Province